An indirect presidential election (officially the 5th Federal Convention) was held in West Germany on 5 March 1969. The incumbent President, Heinrich Lübke had served two terms and was therefore ineligible for a third. The Christian Democratic Union nominated defense minister Gerhard Schröder. Schröder was a controversial choice, even within his own party, since he had been a member of the NSDAP and the SA under Hitler. Other potential candidates included Helmut Kohl and Richard von Weizsäcker, relatively unknown names at the time, who would go on to serve as Chancellor and President respectively. Justice Minister Gustav Heinemann was nominated by the Social Democratic Party and supported by the opposition Free Democratic Party. With neither candidate able to win an absolute majority, Heinemann won the election on the third ballot by only 6 votes.

Gustav Heinemann became the first Social Democrat to be elected German President in 50 years.

Composition of the Federal Convention 
The President is elected by the Federal Convention consisting of all the members of the Bundestag and an equal number of delegates representing the states. These are divided proportionally by population to each state, and each state's delegation is divided among the political parties represented in its parliament so as to reflect the partisan proportions in the parliament.

Source: Eine Dokumentation aus Anlass der Wahl des Bundespräsidenten am 18. März 2012

Results

References

1969 in West Germany
1969
1969 elections in Germany
March 1969 events in Europe
Gustav Heinemann